The Lovelace Bridges were built by William King, 1st Earl of Lovelace (1805-1893) on his estate at East Horsley, Surrey, in the 1860s. Fifteen bridges were built to facilitate the transport of timber by horse-drawn carts. The bridges were built where the tracks crossed existing bridleways or roads. Ten bridges still exist.

The bridges were constructed from local flint and brick; they all had plaques with their name and dates. Most of the bridges are horseshoe shaped "Moorish" design, between a span of six feet at Meadow Plat to eighteen feet for the Dorking Arch, which crosses Crocknorth road. The Earl had his own brickworks in West Horsley/Ockham and the lime for the mortar would have been local, possibly from chalk pits in Kiln Field Coppice. The saw mill was near Brockhole Cross, near the junction with Outdowns on the Epsom Road.

There is a Lovelace Bridges Trail produced by the Horsley Countryside Preservation Society and there is a project to conserve the bridges managed by Forest Enterprise England.

Remaining bridges

External links
 Lovelace Bridges Trail

References

Bridges in Surrey